Lynx Lake is a glacial lake approximately  southeast of Bakers Narrows which drains into Lake Athapapuskow. It is part of the Nelson River watershed, in the Hudson Bay drainage basin in the Northern Region of Manitoba, Canada. The lakes sits in Churchill River Upland portion of the Midwestern Canadian Shield forests and is surrounded by mixed forest with stands of black spruce, white spruce, jack pine, and trembling aspen. The shoreline is characterized by steeply sloping irregular rock ridges and poorly drained areas of muskeg. The lake contains northern pike.

The name was officially adopted in 1941.

See also
List of lakes of Manitoba

References

Lakes of Northern Manitoba
Glacial lakes of Manitoba
Hudson Bay drainage basin